Fitjar Church is a parish church of the Church of Norway in Fitjar Municipality in Vestland county, Norway. It is located in the village of Fitjar. It is the church for the Fitjar parish which is part of the Sunnhordland prosti (deanery) in the Diocese of Bjørgvin. The white, wooden church was built in a long church design in 1867 using plans drawn up by the architect John O. Kaarhus from Skånevik. The church seats about 425 people.

History
A wooden coffin was discovered near the present church in 1997 that was dated to the 10th century, so it is likely the church was in existence at that time. During the early 12th century, a new stone church was built at Fitjar. This stone building was built around the same time as the Old Moster Church was built since the two churches have similar designs. The new church was built of stone and it probably did not have a steeple.

Prior to 1862, Fitjar Church was an annex to the large parish of Stord. In 1862, Fitjar was split off to form its own parish. At that time, it was decided that the old church was too small for the new parish so a new church would be built. On the east end of the choir lies a sacristy and on the west end of the nave is a church porch with a tower above it. Stone from the old church was used in building the foundation for the new church. There were also many items from the old church that were kept and are still used in the new church including the old altarpiece, some brass candlesticks, and the baptismal font. The interior of the church was remodeled using plans drawn up by Einar Vaardal-Lunde in 1957. In 1985, the sacristy in the east was enlarged.

Media gallery

See also
List of churches in Bjørgvin

References

Fitjar
Churches in Vestland
Long churches in Norway
Wooden churches in Norway
19th-century Church of Norway church buildings
Churches completed in 1867
10th-century establishments in Norway